Pleuropneumonia is inflammation of the lungs and pleura, pleurisy being the inflammation of the pleura alone.

See also 
 Contagious bovine pleuropneumonia – a disease in cattle
 Contagious caprine pleuropneumonia – a disease in goats

References

Respiratory diseases